MinutePhysics is an educational YouTube channel created by Henry Reich in 2011. The channel's videos use whiteboard animation to explain physics-related topics. Early videos on the channel were approximately one minute long. , the channel has over 5 million subscribers.

Videos from MinutePhysics have been featured on PBS NewsHour, Huffington Post, NBC, and Gizmodo. MinutePhysics is a channel that can be viewed through YouTube EDU. Videos from the channel published prior to April 2016 are also made available to download as a podcast.

Videos
The most popular MinutePhysics video, with more than 17 million views, discusses whether it is more suitable to walk or to run when trying to avoid rain. Reich also has uploaded a series of three videos explaining the Higgs Boson. In March 2020, Reich produced a video that explained exponential projection of statistics as data is being collected, using the evolving record related to COVID-19 data.

Collaborations
MinutePhysics has collaborated with Vsauce, as well as the director of the Perimeter Institute for Theoretical Physics, Neil Turok, and Destin Sandlin of Smarter Every Day. MinutePhysics also has made two videos that were narrated by Neil deGrasse Tyson and one video narrated by Tom Scott. The channel also collaborated with physicist Sean M. Carroll in a five-part video series on time and entropy and with Grant Sanderson on a video about a lost lecture of physicist Richard Feynman, as well as a video about Bell's Theorem.

Other channels
In October 2011, Reich started a second channel, MinuteEarth. The channel features a similar style to his MinutePhysics videos, with a focus on the physical properties and phenomena that make up and occur on Earth.

In March 2022, MinuteFood was launched.

Standard and Nebula 
MinutePhysics was one of the original founders of the Standard creator community along with Dave Wiskus, CGP Grey, Philipp Dettmer and many other creators.  Through Standard, MinutePhysics has released most of his content on Standard's Nebula streaming service, mostly the same videos he posts on Youtube but ad and sponsorship free, but he also releases some Nebula Originals only on the platform, including two exclusive Nebula Originals MinuteBody and The Illegal Alien.

References

External links
 

Science-related YouTube channels
Whiteboard animation
YouTube channels launched in 2011
English-language YouTube channels
Online edutainment